"Pack Up Your Troubles in Your Old Kit-Bag, and Smile, Smile, Smile" is the full name of a World War I marching song, published in 1915 in London. It was written by Welsh songwriter George Henry Powell under the pseudonym of "George Asaf", and set to music by his brother Felix Powell. The song is best remembered for its chorus.

It was featured in the American show  Her Soldier Boy, which opened in December 1916.

Performers associated with this song include the Victor Military Band, James F. Harrison, Adele Rowland, Murray Johnson, Reinald Werrenrath, and the Knickerbocker Quartet.

A later play presented by the National Theatre recounts how these music hall stars rescued the song from their rejects pile and re-scored it to win a wartime competition for a marching song. It became very popular, boosting British morale despite the horrors of that war. It was one of a large number of music hall songs aimed at maintaining morale, recruiting for the forces, or defending Britain's war aims. Another of these songs, "It's a Long Way to Tipperary", was so similar in musical structure that the two were sometimes sung side by side.

Lyrics
Private Perks is a funny little codger
With a smile a funny smile.
Five feet none, he’s an artful little dodger
With a smile a funny smile.
Flush or broke he’ll have his little joke,
He can’t be suppress’d.
All the other fellows have to grin
When he gets this off his chest, Hi!

Chorus (sung twice)
Pack up your troubles in your old kit-bag,
And smile, smile, smile,
While you’ve a lucifer to light your fag,
Smile, boys, that’s the style.
What’s the use of worrying?
It never was worth while, so
Pack up your troubles in your old kit-bag,
And smile, smile, smile.

Private Perks went a-marching into Flanders
With his smile his funny smile.
He was lov’d by the privates and commanders
For his smile his funny smile.
When a throng of Bosches came along
With a mighty swing,
Perks yell’d out, “This little bunch is mine!
Keep your heads down, boys and sing, Hi!

Private Perks he came back from Bosche-shooting
With his smile his funny smile.
Round his home he then set about recruiting
With his smile his funny smile.
He told all his pals, the short, the tall,
What a time he’d had;
And as each enlisted like a man
Private Perks said ‘Now my lad,’ Hi!

A large amount of covers of the song replace the lyric "While you've a lucifer to light your fag" with "Don't let your joy and laughter hear the snag", due to the health effects of smoking.

In other languages
The Dutch version goes:

Pak al je zorgen in je plunjezak en fluit, fluit, fluit!
Aan alle moeilijkheden heb je lak, fluit man en 't is uit!
Waarom zou je treuren, het helpt je niet vooruit,
Dus: pak al je zorgen in je plunjezak en fluit, fluit, fluit.

The Spanish version

¡Guarda tus penas en el fondo del morral y ríe ya!
Ponte contento y así vencerás la dificultad.
Siempre estarás alegre, nunca triste estarás, ¡no! [or ¡jamás!]
¡Guarda tus penas en el fondo del morral y ríe ya!

The German version:

Weit ist der Weg zurück ins Heimatland, so weit, so weit
Dort bei den Sternen über'm Waldesrand liegt die alte Zeit
Jeder brave Musketier sehnt heimlich sich nach dir
Weit ist der Weg zurück ins Heimatland, ja weit, so weit!

The Norwegian translation "Legg dine sørger i en gammel sekk" (possibly 1916) and the Swedish "Lägg dina sorger i en gammal säck" (1917) were by written by Karl-Ewert Christenson (1888–1965) and recorded by singer Ernst Rolf.

Other performances 
Florrie Forde performed it throughout the United Kingdom in 1916.

Other performers associated with this song include Helen Clark, Reinald Werrenrath, and Oscar Seagle.

Cilla Black performed the song as a comedy/singing sketch on her variety television series Surprise Surprise.

The original version was interpolated in and inspired the song "Pack Up" by English musician Eliza Doolittle.

In film 
The song appears in several films, including Varsity Show with Dick Powell Pack Up Your Troubles (1932) with Laurel & Hardy, High Pressure (1932), and The Shopworn Angel (1938). It is also featured in For Me and My Gal (1942) starring Judy Garland and Gene Kelly, and “On Moonlight Bay” with Gordon MacRae and Doris Day (1951). Tilly the Hippo sings a portion in Cats don't dance (1997).

The song also featured briefly in the 1979 film All That Jazz, sung between Joe Gideon (Roy Scheider) and a hospital orderly. It was sung during a march in the 2010 film, Private Peaceful, based on the book by Michael Morpurgo.

The song is also played by Schroeder in "It's the Great Pumpkin, Charlie Brown" and in an episode of The Waltons.

In the Rugrats episode "Music", Chuckie sings this song.

It was also sung during the opening credits of the 1970 Blake Edwards film, Darling Lili, starring Julie Andrews.

In the second Sapphire & Steel serial (”The Railway Station") the tune is frequently used during the paranormal sequences involving military personnel (including a World War One soldier).

Literary references
 The title of Wilfred Owen's bitter anti-war poem "Smile, Smile, Smile" (September 1918) was derived from the song.
 Richard Thompson, famous for often dark and gloomy themes in his music, released an album in 2003 titled The Old Kit Bag.
 In John Dickson Carr's novel The Devil in Velvet, the protagonist — a WWI veteran — hears the song in a nightmare of his war experiences: "He heard a great noise of voices singing to music. It was a cheerful song, roared out with mighty cheerfulness, yet underneath every word ran a strain of heartbreak." (Ch.XIV).
 The nine-year-old American Girl character Kit Kittredge is enchanted by her father singing her this song, and this inspires her to take on "Kit" as a nickname rather than go by her full name, Margaret Mildred Kittredge.
In Libba Bray's novel, Lair of Dreams, a character hears a distorted version of the song while in a dream.
In his 1983 song “Pills and Soap,” Elvis Costello sings “So pack up your troubles in a stolen handbag.”

Video game usage
 A female splicer can be heard singing the song in BioShock Infinite: Burial at Sea Part 2.
 The character Probst Wyatt III, from 2014's Wolfenstein: The New Order sings this song as part of a diversionary tactic during the game's prologue.
 Edwards, McManus and Townsend can be heard singing this song in the chapter "Through Mud and Blood" in the Battlefield 1 campaign. It can be heard at random after the final tank battle.

References

External links

 BBC - How Pack Up Your Troubles Became the Viral Hit of WW1

1915 songs
Songs of World War I